Huanipaca District is one of the nine districts of the Abancay Province in Peru.

Geography 
One of the highest peaks of the district is Ampay at  located in the Ampay National Sanctuary. Other mountains are listed below:

Ethnic groups 
The people in the district are mainly indigenous citizens of Quechua descent. Quechua is the language which the majority of the population (77.81%) learnt to speak in childhood, 21.41% of the residents started speaking using the Spanish language (2007 Peru Census).

See also 
 Qurimarka

References

Populated places established in 1893
1893 establishments in Peru
Districts of the Abancay Province
Districts of the Apurímac Region